Hiroko Uehara (上原 公子, Uehara Hiroko) is a Japanese centre-left politician and policy consultant. From 1999 to 2007, she served for two terms as mayor of Kunitachi City, becoming the first female mayor in Tokyo.

Uehara was born in 1949 in Miyazaki City, Miyazaki Prefecture. After attending Miyazaki prefectural Miyazaki-Ōmiya High School (Miyazaki kenritsu Miyazaki Ōmiya kōtō-gakkō), she graduated from the Faculty of Letters of Hōsei University, but subsequently broke off her postgraduate studies. Later, she became the leader of the female consumer-driven local party Tokyo Seikatsusha Network, part of the national citizens' network movement (also known as "representative/deputy/proxy movement", 代理人運動, dairinin undō), and was elected to the assembly of Kunitachi City. In 1999, Uehara won the mayoral election, ending a two-decade streak of conservative/centre-right mayors. After two terms, she did not stand for re-election (the network movement has rules on assembly member rotation and chief executive term limits). With centre-left support including hers, Hiroshi Sekiguchi was elected to succeed her.

In the 2007 regular election, she tried to win a seat in the House of Councillors via the Social Democratic Party list in the proportional district; but she received only 108,636 votes nationwide, making her fourth on the SDP list while the party won only two seats in the proportional election. In the 2016 Tokyo gubernatorial election, Uehara ran a support group for centre-left candidate Shuntarō Torigoe.

References

External links 
 Short profile at consulting company KK System Brain (株式会社システムブレーン) (in Japanese)
 Greens Japan: Uehara's message for the occasion of the foundation of Midori no Tō in 2012
 Website of the jichitai giin seisaku jōhō centre Niji to Midori (自治体議員政策情報センター 虹とみどり, lit. "'rainbow and green' policy information centre [for] assembly members [from] autonomous authorities [=prefectures & municipalities]") headed by Uehara

Mayors of places in Tokyo

Women mayors of places in Japan
Living people
Year of birth missing (living people)